Rushbrook is a surname. The surname derives from Rushbrooke in Suffolk, England. Notable people with the surname include:

 Claire Rushbrook (born 1971), English actress
 Philip Rushbrook, governor of Saint Helena, Ascension and Tristan da Cunha
 Rosalyn Rushbrook (born 1942), British author
 Selina Rushbrook (1880–1907), née Selina Ann Jenkins, was a petty criminal, prostitute and brothel keeper from Swansea, Wales

See also 
 Rushbrook Williams, a historian and civil servant
 Rush Brook, a river in Pennsylvania, United States
 Rushbrooke, County Cork, Ireland
 Rushbrooke, West Suffolk, Suffolk, England
 Rushbrooke inequality, the critical exponents of a magnetic system

References